The 2005 African Judo Championships were the 26th edition of the African Judo Championships, and were held in Port Elizabeth, South Africa from 18 May to 21 May 2005.

Medal overview

Men

Women

Medal table

External links
 
 2005 African Judo Championships results (International Judo Federation)

A
African Judo Championships
African Judo Championships
International sports competitions hosted by South Africa
Sport in Port Elizabeth
African Judo Championships, 2005
Judo competitions in South Africa
May 2005 sports events in Africa